DODC is a psychedelic drug from the substituted amphetamine family which acts as an agonist of the 5-HT2A receptor. It is the 3,4-dichloro derivative of the well known psychedelic drug 2,5-Dimethoxy-4-chloroamphetamine (DOC). DODC was first officially published in a patent filed by Gilgamesh Pharmaceuticals in 2020, though anecdotal reports suggest it had been synthesised by clandestine chemists and its activity established several years prior to this.

See also 
 DOx
 Ganesha (psychedelic)
 DMMDA
 2,3,4,5-Tetramethoxyamphetamine

References 

Designer drugs
Psychedelic phenethylamines
Serotonin receptor agonists
Methoxy compounds